Eugenie Kain (1 April 1960 – 8 January 2010) was an Austrian writer.

The daughter of Franz and Margit Kain, she was born in Linz. She studied art history and philosophy at the Catholic Private University Linz and German and Theater Studies in Vienna. From 1984 to 1990, she worked for the newspaper Volksstimme. She helped launch the Linz street paper  in 1996.

In 2007, she received the Kulturpreis des Landes Oberösterreich for literature.

Kain was married to the musician August Maly, who died in 2002.

She was a member of the Communist Party of Austria (KPO) and ran as a KPO candidate for the European Parliament. She also contributed to the leftist newspaper Café KPÖ.

Kain died in Linz at the age of 49 from cancer.

Selected works 
 Sehnsucht nach Tamanrasset, stories  (1999)
 Hohe Wasser, stories (2004)
 Flüsterlieder, stories (2006)
 Schneckenkönig, stories (2009)

References 

1960 births
2010 deaths
Austrian women novelists
Austrian women short story writers
Austrian journalists